Baltasar Rigo Cifré (born 26 June 1985 in Campos, Majorca, Balearic Islands) is a Spanish footballer who plays for CE Campos as a central defender.

Football career
A product of local RCD Mallorca's youth ranks, Rigo made his senior debut in the 2004–05 season in the third division, being relegated. After a second year, he signed for SD Huesca also in the third level, appearing in only two matches as the Aragonese club achieved a first-ever promotion to division two in 2008 (22 minutes of action).

In the summer of 2009, Rigo moved to the fourth division and joined UD Almería B on a free transfer, being an important defensive unit to help them promote to the third tier for the first time. Subsequently, he was promoted to the first team by manager Juan Manuel Lillo, also signing a professional contract.

On 5 December 2010, Rigo made his debut for Almería's main squad, starting – but also conceding a penalty and being booked – in a 1–1 home draw against Real Zaragoza. In the following transfer window, however, he left Andalusia and returned to Huesca.

References

External links

1985 births
Living people
Spanish footballers
Footballers from Mallorca
Association football defenders
La Liga players
Segunda División players
Segunda División B players
Tercera División players
RCD Mallorca B players
SD Huesca footballers
UD Almería B players
UD Almería players
Girona FC players
CD Numancia players
CD Tenerife players
CD Guijuelo footballers
CD Llosetense players